Hemmings is a surname, and may refer to:

 Commerce
 Trevor Hemmings (born 1935), British billionaire business person

 Performing arts and entertainment
 David Hemmings (1941–2003), British actor, director, producer
 Myra Hemmings (1895–1968), American actress and educator
 Nolan Hemmings (born 1970), British actor
 Luke Hemmings (born 1996), Australian, member of the pop band, 5 Seconds of Summer

 Public service
 Anita Florence Hemmings (1872–1960), Boston librarian (African American)

 Sports
 Deon Hemmings (born 1968), former female 400 meters hurdler
 Eddie Hemmings (cricketer) (born 1949), former British cricketer
 Eddie Hemmings (rugby league), English rugby commentator
 Fred Hemmings (born 1946), American surfer, author
 Guy Hemmings (born 1962), Canadian curler
 Tony Hemmings (born 1967), English footballer

Other
 Hemmings Motor News, a publication founded by Ernest Hemmings

See also
 Hemming (disambiguation)
 Hemings